Wad al Hulaywah (ود الحليو) is a populated place in the state of Kassala, Sudan.

References

Kassala (state)